Luigi Borghetti (born 31 January 1943) is a retired Italian cyclist who was active between 1967 and 1977. He competed at the 1968 Summer Olympics in the 2 km tandem event and finished in fourth place together with Walter Gorini. The same year he won the world sprint title.

References

1943 births
Living people
People from Rho, Lombardy
Cyclists at the 1968 Summer Olympics
Olympic cyclists of Italy
Italian male cyclists
Cyclists from the Metropolitan City of Milan